The eleventh electoral unit of the Federation of Bosnia and Herzegovina is a parliamentary constituency used to elect members to the House of Representatives of the Federation of Bosnia and Herzegovina since 2000.  Located within Sarajevo Canton, it consists of the municipalities of Centar, Ilijaš, Novo Sarajevo, Stari Grad, and Vogošća.

Demographics

Representatives

References

Constituencies of Bosnia and Herzegovina